James Houston (October 10, 1767 – June 8, 1819) was a United States district judge of the United States District Court for the District of Maryland.

Education

Born in Chestertown, Maryland, Houston read law to enter the bar in 1806.

Federal judicial service

Houston was nominated by President Thomas Jefferson on April 19, 1806, to a seat on the United States District Court for the District of Maryland vacated by Judge James Winchester. Houston was confirmed by the United States Senate and received his commission, on April 21, 1806. He served until his death on June 8, 1819, in Chestertown.

References

Sources
 

1767 births
1819 deaths
Judges of the United States District Court for the District of Maryland
United States federal judges appointed by Thomas Jefferson
19th-century American judges
United States federal judges admitted to the practice of law by reading law
People from Chestertown, Maryland